The Premio 40 Principales for Best Spanish Pop/Dance Act was an honor presented as part of Los Premios 40 Principales. This category was only featured in the 2011 edition.

Spanish music awards
Spanish Pop/Dance Act
S